Henryk Czech (21 September 1934 – 4 March 1994) was a Polish footballer. He played in one match for the Poland national football team in 1956.

References

External links
 

1934 births
1994 deaths
Polish footballers
Poland international footballers
Sportspeople from Zabrze
Association football forwards
Górnik Zabrze players